Mount Clitheroe is a summit in Alberta, Canada. It takes its name from Clitheroe, in England.

References

Clitheroe
Alberta's Rockies